According to the U.S. National Center for Education Statistics, school violence is a serious problem. In 2007, the latest year for which comprehensive data were available, a nationwide survey, conducted biennially by the Centers for Disease Control and Prevention (CDC) and involving representative samples of U.S. high school students, found that 5.9% of students carried a weapon (e.g. gun, knife, etc.) on school property during the 30 days antedating the survey. The rate was three times higher among men than among women. In the 12 months antedating the survey, 7.8% of high school students reported having been threatened or injured with a weapon on school property at least once, with the prevalence rate among men twice that as among women. In the 12 months antedating the survey, 12.4% of students had been in a physical fight on school property at least once. The rate among men was twice the rate found among women.  n the 30 days antedating the survey, 5.5% of students reported that because they did not feel safe, they did not go to school on at least one day. The rates for males and females were approximately equal.

The most recent U.S. data on violent crime in which teachers were targeted indicate that 7% (10% in urban schools) of teachers in 2003 were subject to threats of injury by students. According to the data 5% of teachers in urban schools were physically attacked, with smaller percentages in suburban and rural schools. Other members of school staffs are also at risk for violent attacks, with school bus drivers being particularly vulnerable.

During 2007–08, teachers’ reports of being threatened or physically attacked by students varied according to the instructional level of their school. A greater percentage of secondary school teachers, 8%, than elementary school teachers, 7%, reported being threatened with injury by a student, and this pattern held for teachers in suburban schools as well as for teachers in rural schools (figure 5.2 and table 5.1).

Controversies

Lax school authorities
In 2005, on a school bus in Montgomery County, Maryland, an 11-year-old girl was attacked by a group of several older boys who the girl said, grabbed her breasts and feigned sex acts.  Also in 2005 on a school bus in Colonial Heights, Virginia, south of Richmond, three boys and two girls aged 8 to 13 held an 11-year-old girl down in the back of the bus and sexually assaulted her. In the Maryland case, the child's mother called the police, not the school, although a school administrator did notify the girl's mother (the students were not charged with sexual assault because the police mishandled the paperwork). In the Virginia case, the girl told her mother and was taken to a police station, prompting coordinated investigations by the police and the school. The bus driver testified she saw the incident happening but never stopped the bus. The girl was dropped off at her normal bus stop.

In 2008, the Baltimore School District failed to intervene in an act of violence committed against a teacher. A student had taken a video of a peer beating her art teacher. School officials ignored the problem until the video was posted on MySpace. Some cases of school violence have not been brought to the attention of the authorities because school administrators did not want their schools labeled unsafe under the No Child Left Behind (NCLB) Act. With or without NCLB, in the US, there has been a history of underreporting violent incidents occurring in schools.

The media
School shootings are rare and unusual forms of school violence, and account for less than 1% of violent crimes in public schools, with an average of 16.5 deaths per year from 2001–2008. There exists an uneven number of male versus female perpetrators of school shootings, where males outnumber females. Some commentators claim that media coverage encourages school violence. On the other hand, the press would likely have been faulted if it did not cover serious threats to public safety such as the Virginia Tech massacre, Columbine massacre, and Sandy Hook Elementary School shooting.

See also
School violence in the United Kingdom
School corporal punishment in the United States
Educational Inequality in the United States

References

Attacks on schools in the United States
Education in the United States
United States